The 2008 Premier League speedway season was the second division of motorcycle speedway racing in the United Kingdom and the 14th season since its creation in 1995. The league was governed by the Speedway Control Bureau (SCB), in conjunction with the British Speedway Promoters' Association (BSPA).

Summary
The League consisted of 16 teams for the 2008 season with the addition of the 2007 Conference League champions the Scunthorpe Scorpions. New rules introduced for 2008 include three points for an away win compared to two points in 2007, and the removal of bonus points, in which a team was awarded an additional point for an aggregate win over a home and away match against another team. The team finishing at the top of the league table at the end of the season after accumulating the most points were declared the Premier League champions. The four highest placed teams were entered into promotion play-offs, whereby the Premier League play-off winner faced the Elite League relegation play-off final losers over two legs. Teams finishing in fifth to twelfth at the time of the fixture cut-off date compete in the Young Shield. Newport Wasps withdrew from the league following the death of their promoter Tim Stone.

The Edinburgh Monarchs were crowned the Premier League champions after ending the season as the highest placed team. The Somerset Rebels finished second, King's Lynn Stars third and the Rye House Rockets fourth. All four teams took part in the promotion play-off with Edinburgh and King's Lynn reaching the final. Edinburgh won 93–90 on aggregate and faced Elite League team Wolverhampton Wolves, but lost the two-legged promotion/relegation final 106–76.

Final league table

Premier League Knockout Cup
The 2008 Premier League Knockout Cup was the 41st edition of the Knockout Cup for tier two teams. Somerset Rebels were the winners of the competition.

First round

Second round

ns match not staged Rye House into next round

Quarter-finals

Semi-finals

Final
First leg

Second leg

Somerset were declared Knockout Cup Champions, winning on aggregate 98–84.

Final leading averages

Riders & final averages
Berwick

Adrian Rymel 10.07
Michal Makovský 8.27
Paul Clews 6.92
Norbert Magosi 6.47
Tero Aarnio 6.36
Scott Smith 5.87 
Guglielmo Franchetti 4.91
Tony Atkin 4.67
Adam McKinna 3.03

Birmingham

Jason Lyons 9.97 
Adam Roynon 8.65
Tomasz Piszcz 7.88
Craig Watson 7.68
Kyle Legault 7.37
James Birkinshaw 5.56
Lee Smart 5.21
Jack Roberts 4.38
Ben Taylor 3.79
James Cockle 3.67
Jack Hargreaves 3.59
Jay Herne 2.94

Edinburgh

Ryan Fisher 8.80 
Matthew Wethers 8.28 
William Lawson 8.00
Thomas H. Jonasson 7.78
Andrew Tully 7.73
Derek Sneddon 7.11
Aaron Summers 6.15 

Glasgow

Shane Parker 9.38 
Robert Ksiezak 6.97
Trent Leverington 6.80 
Josh Grajczonek 6.22
Ross Brady 5.79
Lee Dicken 5.55
Anders Andersen 4.58
Mitchell Davey 2.94

Isle of Wight

Jason Bunyan 8.07
Krzysztof Stojanowski 7.35
Cory Gathercole 7.32
Paul Fry 7.10
Glen Phillips 7.00
James Holder 6.10
Richard Sweetman 5.82
Andrew Bargh 3.96

King's Lynn

Kevin Doolan 10.47
Tomáš Topinka 9.98 
Shaun Tacey 7.28
Russell Harrison 7.12
Simon Lambert 6.61
John Oliver 6.35
Kozza Smith 6.23

Mildenhall

Kaj Laukkanen 8.17
Robbie Kessler 7.44
Theo Pijper 4.98
Michał Rajkowski 4.66
Sebastian Truminski 4.57
Jan Graversen 4.51
Marek Mroz 4.35
Mark Baseby 3.46
Henning Loof 3.05
Casper Wortmann 3.05
Luke Priest 2.67
Jari Makinen 2.31
Matthew Wright 2.29

Newcastle

Josef Franc 7.89
Jason King 7.82
Kenni Larsen 7.79
Christian Henry 7.28
George Štancl 7.20
Ben Powell 5.43
Richard Juul 4.31
Sean Stoddart 4.18
Jamie Robertson 3.79
Jerran Hart 3.59

Newport (withdrew from league)

Craig Watson 6.60
Tony Atkin 6.44
Sebastian Truminski 6.27
Nick Simmons 5.91
Paul Clews 5.49
Marek Mroz 4.63
Jerran Hart 2.40

Reading

Ulrich Østergaard 10.29 
Mark Lemon 8.04
Tom P. Madsen 6.66
Chris Mills 5.76
Tomáš Suchánek 5.34
Jamie Smith 5.07
Nicki Glanz 4.59
Danny Warwick 4.56

Redcar

Gary Havelock 9.27 
James Grieves 9.10
Ty Proctor 8.24
Chris Kerr 7.54
Josh Auty 5.45
Daniel Giffard 4.16
Benji Compton 4.00
Arlo Bugeja 3.63
Joni Keskinen 1.28

Rye House

Tai Woffinden 10.15
Stefan Ekberg 8.11 
Chris Neath 8.10
Tommy Allen 7.79
Robert Mear 7.15
Luke Bowen 6.20 
Danny Betson 5.03
Daniel Halsey 3.78

Scunthorpe

Magnus Karlsson 7.90
Richard Hall 7.17
Andrew Moore 7.16
Carl Wilkinson 6.93
Viktor Bergström 6.58
Emiliano Sanchez 6.42
Ben Powell 5.49
Byron Bekker 4.62
Benji Compton 3.52

Sheffield

Andre Compton 9.09 
Ricky Ashworth 8.25 
Joel Parsons 7.29
Ben Wilson 7.26
Paul Cooper 6.38
Lee Smethills 5.92
Sam Martin 2.56
Kyle Hughes 2.30

Somerset

Jason Doyle 10.28 
Emil Kramer 8.14 
Simon Walker 8.05
Jordan Frampton 7.31 
Stephan Katt 6.66
Brent Werner 6.34
Matthias Kröger 6.29 

Stoke

Ben Barker 8.23 
Lee Complin 7.95
Andrew Moore 6.87
Emiliano Sanchez 6.39
Mark Burrows 5.64
Jesper Kristiansen 5.63
Klaus Jakobsen 5.48
Barrie Evans 5.04
Krister Jacobsen 4.64

Workington

Daniel Nermark 10.53
Kauko Nieminen .9.50
Carl Stonehewer 7.93
Joe Haines 6.22
Charles Wright 5.12
Tomi Reima 5.03
John Branney 4.79
Scott Smith 3.28

See also
List of United Kingdom Speedway League Champions
Knockout Cup (speedway)

References

Speedway Premier League
Premier League
Speedway Premier League